Dhat-Badan, Dhat-hami, or  Zat-Badar, ´She of the Wild Goats` and ´She of the Sanctuary', was a Himyarite  goddess.

Dhat-Badan was a nature goddess of the oasis, nature and the wet season were worshipped at tree-circled pools throughout the region of ancient Yemen, Somalia, and Ethiopia.

She was said to forbid any invocation to her when there was no seeress or priestess present in her sanctuary. In the sanctuary, a female priestess called a khalimah (literally 'Dreamer') would lie down and sleep before the sacred tree(s) of the goddess to receive an oracle in the form of a prophetic dream.

She was a popular goddess of the polytheists of Axum. The she-ibex was sacred to her and it was said that an island in the Red Sea inhabited by ibexes was under her protection.

References

Arabian goddesses
Nature goddesses
Oases